is a Japanese manga series written and illustrated by Takao Aoyagi. It was serialized in Shogakukan's shōnen manga magazine Monthly Shōnen Sunday from May 2014 to September 2016.

Publication
Written and illustrated by Takao Aoyagi, Dai-13 Hokenshitsu was serialized in Shogakukan's shōnen manga magazine Monthly Shōnen Sunday from May 12, 2014, to September 12, 2016. Shogakukan collected its chapters in four tankōbon volumes, released from November 12, 2014, to October 12, 2016.

Volume list

References

External links
 

Comedy anime and manga
School life in anime and manga
Shogakukan manga
Shōnen manga